NH 136 may refer to:

 National Highway 136 (India)
 New Hampshire Route 136, United States